Galyna Volodymyrivna "Galia" Dvorak Khasanova (born 1 April 1988) is a Spanish table tennis player. She was born in Kyiv, but her family moved to Spain when she was two.  Both of her parents (Vladimir Dvorak and Flora Khasanova) were also international table tennis players.  She won a bronze medal in the women's team event at the 2009 Mediterranean Games in Pescara, Italy. As of May 2019, Dvorak is ranked no. 94 in the world by the International Table Tennis Federation (ITTF). Dvorak is a member of the table tennis team for CN Mataró, and is coached and trained by Peter Engel, Linus Mernsten, and her mother Flora Khasanova. She is also right-handed, and uses the classic grip.

Dvorak made her official debut, as a 20-year-old, at the 2008 Summer Olympics in Beijing, where she competed only in the inaugural women's team event. Playing with Chinese emigrants Shen Yanfei and Zhu Fang, Dvorak placed third in the preliminary pool round, with a total of four points, two defeats from Japan and South Korea, and a single victory over the Australian trio Miao Miao, Jian Fang Lay, and Stephanie Sang Xu.

Four years after competing in her first Olympics, Dvorak qualified for her second Spanish team, as a 24-year-old, at the 2012 Summer Olympics in London, by receiving an allocation spot from the Final World Qualifying Tournament in Doha, Qatar. With a maximum of two quotas per nation in the singles tournament, Dvorak accepted the third spot, and thereby competed only in the women's team event, along with her fellow players Sara Ramírez and Shen Yanfei. Dvorak and her team lost the first round match to the formidable Chinese trio Li Xiaoxia, Guo Yue, and Ding Ning, with a unanimous set score of 0–3 (4–11, 7–11, 12–14).

At the 2016 Summer Olympics, she competed in the women's singles only.  She was a replacement for the injured French player Carole Grundisch.  She lost to home player Lin Gui in her first match.

References

External links
 
 NBC Olympics Profile

1988 births
Living people
Spanish female table tennis players
Table tennis players at the 2008 Summer Olympics
Table tennis players at the 2012 Summer Olympics
Table tennis players at the 2016 Summer Olympics
Olympic table tennis players of Spain
Sportspeople from Barcelona
Sportspeople from Kyiv
Spanish people of Ukrainian descent
Table tennis players at the 2015 European Games
European Games competitors for Spain
Mediterranean Games bronze medalists for Spain
Competitors at the 2009 Mediterranean Games
Mediterranean Games medalists in table tennis
Table tennis players at the 2019 European Games
Table tennis players at the 2020 Summer Olympics
20th-century Spanish women
21st-century Spanish women